Daniele Zotti (born 23 February 1997) is a Belgian football player of Italian descent.

Club career
He made his Eerste Divisie debut for Roda JC Kerkrade on 26 October 2018 in a game against Jong AZ, as a starter.

References

External links
 

1997 births
Sportspeople from Genk
Footballers from Limburg (Belgium)
Belgian people of Italian descent
Living people
Belgian footballers
Belgian expatriate footballers
Association football defenders
K. Patro Eisden Maasmechelen players
Roda JC Kerkrade players
Belgian Third Division players
Eerste Divisie players
Belgian expatriate sportspeople in France
Belgian expatriate sportspeople in the Netherlands
Expatriate footballers in France
Expatriate footballers in the Netherlands